Anaphase-promoting complex subunit 10 is an enzyme that in humans is encoded by the ANAPC10 gene.

Interactions 

ANAPC10 has been shown to interact with CDC27, Mothers against decapentaplegic homolog 3 and Mothers against decapentaplegic homolog 2.

References

Further reading

External links